Robert Farrell (born 25 July 1949) is a Trinidad former cyclist. He competed in the team pursuit at the 1968 Summer Olympics.

References

1949 births
Living people
Trinidad and Tobago male cyclists
Commonwealth Games competitors for Trinidad and Tobago
Cyclists at the 1970 British Commonwealth Games
Olympic cyclists of Trinidad and Tobago
Cyclists at the 1968 Summer Olympics
20th-century Trinidad and Tobago people